Tutu is a common name of Māori origin for plants in the genus Coriaria found in New Zealand.

Six New Zealand native species are known by the name:
Coriaria angustissima
Coriaria arborea
Coriaria lurida
Coriaria plumosa
Coriaria pteridoides

They are shrubs or trees; some are endemic to New Zealand. Most of the plant parts are poisonous, containing the neurotoxin tutin and its derivative hyenanchin. The widespread species Coriaria arborea is most often linked to cases of poisoning.

Honey containing tutin can be produced by honey bees feeding on honeydew produced by sap-sucking vine hopper insects (genus Scolypopa) feeding on tutu. The last recorded deaths from eating honey containing tutin were in the 1890s, although sporadic outbreaks of toxic honey poisoning continue to occur. Poisoning symptoms include delirium, vomiting, and coma.

In the series 4 episode 3 of "The Brokenwood Mysteries" (2014), "The Scarecrow", the murder victim was killed by honey contaminated with tutin.

References

External links
 Tutu, 1966 Encyclopedia of New Zealand

Coriariaceae
Flora of New Zealand